Alex Nahuel Luna (born 31 March 2004) is an Argentine professional footballer who plays as an attacking midfielder for Atlético de Rafaela.

Club career
Luna came through the youth ranks at Atlético de Rafaela, having joined at the age of nine from 9 de Julio. He scored sixteen goals in Rafaela's academy in 2019–20, finishing as their top scorer. He was promoted into the first-team set-up in 2020 under manager Walter Otta, with the midfielder signing his first professional contract on 2 October; penning terms until December 2022, amid interest from clubs from home and abroad. Luna would then make his senior debut at the age of sixteen on 7 December during a Primera B Nacional victory over Tigre, after he replaced Facundo Soloa with eighteen minutes left.

International career
Before his professional debut for Atlético de Rafaela, Luna had already received call-ups from Argentina's U15s and U17s. He won the Vlatko Marković Tournament with the former.

Personal life
Luna is of Spanish descent, through his great-grandmother.

Career statistics
.

Honours
Argentina U15
Vlatko Marković Tournament: 2019

References

External links

2004 births
Living people
People from Rafaela
Argentine sportspeople of Spanish descent
Argentine footballers
Argentina youth international footballers
Association football midfielders
Primera Nacional players
Atlético de Rafaela footballers
Sportspeople from Santa Fe Province